The Convent of St. John of Rila (Иоанновский монастырь) is the largest convent in St. Petersburg, Russia and the only stauropegic nunnery in that city. 

John of Kronstadt (later Saint John of Kronstadt) established the monastery on the bank of the Karpovka River in 1900 as a branch of the  Sura Monastery of St. John the Theologian. The ground floor contains the marble tomb of Saint John of Kronstadt. 

The Soviets disbanded the convent in 1923. It re-opened as a branch of Pühtitsa Convent in 1991.

External links 
 

Monasteries in Saint Petersburg
Convents in Russia
Russian Orthodox monasteries in Russia
Byzantine Revival architecture in Russia
Christian organizations established in 1900
Religious buildings and structures completed in 1902
Cultural heritage monuments of regional significance in Saint Petersburg